The Leeds City Council elections were held on Thursday, 4 May 1995, with one third of the council up for election, alongside a vacancy in Roundhay.

Labour won another victory over the opposition parties, winning a record number of wards as the Labour gains extended further into Conservative heartland. A disastrous result for the Tories saw them fall even further from the record lows they set the year before, losing Cookridge, North and Roundhay for the first time - with Wetherby their sole defence. Labour gained eight in total, securing second councillors in the previously reliable Conservative wards of Aireborough, Halton, Pudsey North and Weetwood. As a result, Labour represented over three-quarters of the council with a formidable majority of 51.

Having overtaken the Conservative vote the previous year, the Lib Dems fell behind again, but unlike the Conservatives were able to defend their three seats. As such, the holding up of the Labour's vote from strong figure achieved the year before was enough to win them their greatest share, amidst a poor turnout of 32.5%.

Elsewhere, the Greens firmed up their second place in Wortley and increased their slate to cover half of the wards, whilst the Liberals fielded one fewer to match the number of Independents - all three of which making little impact. The leftist splinters from Labour, Militant Labour, and the now-defunct CPGB, Communist Party of Britain also fielded a first candidate each.

Election result

|- style="background-color:#F9F9F9"
! style="background-color: " |
| Militant Labour
| align="right" | 0
| align="right" | 0
| align="right" | 0
| align="right" | 0
| align="right" | 0.0
| align="right" | 0.2
| align="right" | 368
| align="right" | +0.2%
|-

This result has the following consequences for the total number of seats on the council after the elections:

Ward results

|- style="background-color:#F9F9F9"
! style="background-color: " |
| Militant Labour
| C. Hill
| align="right" | 368
| align="right" | 10.2
| align="right" | +10.2
|-

By-elections between 1995 and 1996

References

1995 English local elections
1995
1990s in Leeds